The 2015 BB&T Atlanta Open was a professional tennis tournament played on hard courts. It was the 28th edition of the tournament, and part of the 2015 ATP World Tour and the 2015 US Open Series. It took place at Atlantic Station in Atlanta, United States between July 27 and August 2, 2015. It was the first men's event of the 2015 US Open Series.

Singles main-draw entrants

Seeds 

 1 Rankings are as of July 20, 2015

Other entrants 
The following players received wildcards into the singles main draw:
  Christopher Eubanks 
  Ryan Harrison
  Frances Tiafoe

The following player received entry as a special exempt:
  Michael Berrer

The following players received entry from the qualifying draw:
  Somdev Devvarman
  Jared Donaldson
  Austin Krajicek
  Denis Kudla

Withdrawals 
Before the tournament
  Kevin Anderson →replaced by Go Soeda
  Chung Hyeon →replaced by Dudi Sela
  Janko Tipsarević →replaced by Ričardas Berankis

Retirements 
  Michael Berrer

ATP doubles main-draw entrants

Seeds

1 Rankings are as of July 20, 2015

Other entrants
The following pairs received wildcards into the doubles main draw:
  Christopher Eubanks /  Donald Young
  Mardy Fish /  Andy Roddick

Finals

Singles 

  John Isner defeated  Marcos Baghdatis, 6–3, 6–3
6–3, 6–3

Doubles 

  Bob Bryan /  Mike Bryan defeated  Colin Fleming /  Gilles Müller, 4–6, 7–6(7–2), [10–4]

References

External links 
 

2015 ATP World Tour
2015
July 2015 sports events in the United States
August 2015 sports events in the United States
2015 in sports in Georgia (U.S. state)
2015 in Atlanta